Sichuan opera (Sichuanese Pinyin: Cuan1ju4) is a type of Chinese opera originating in China's Sichuan province around 1700. Today's Sichuan opera is a relatively recent synthesis of 5 historic melodic styles. Regionally Chengdu remains to be the main home of Sichuan opera, while other influential locales include Chongqing, Guizhou, Yunnan, Hubei and Taiwan. Sichuan Opera was listed in the first batch of 518 national intangible cultural heritage list announced on May 20, 2006.

History
Initially there were 5 distinct opera styles. The history of each style varies greatly.

At least one of the Chinese operatic styles began as early as the Three Kingdoms period with some form of Canjun opera. During the Tang dynasty, a band of five came about in Chengdu. In the Song dynasty, the opera developed into zaju. In the Ming dynasty, artists performed the skill in Jinling (modern-day Nanjing). During the reign of Yongzheng and Qianlong emperor in the Qing dynasty, in the Huabu areas, Kunqu, Yiyang, Bangzi and Pihuang melody merged with local languages, folk customs, ditties, yang-kos and Lantern theatre (Dengdiao) in Sichuan.

During the early 20th century, a revival movement began to reform the art. The best known reformer was Kang Zhilin, who led the Sanqinq (Three Celebrations) Company.  This company was one of the most notable opera troupes, established in 1912, and combined the 5 styles into a single opera on the same stage. Each style retained its own music.  One of the classic skills devised by Kang Zhilin included a high kick that leaves a "third eye" in the middle of the forehead. This has remained one of Sichuan opera's trademark moves.

During the Cultural Revolution, the art form suffered somewhat. But it continued to flourish afterwards, especially since the 1978 Chinese economic reform.

Performance
Overall the art form is well known for its singing, which is less constrained than that of the more popular Beijing opera form. Sichuan opera is more like a play than other forms of Chinese opera, and the acting is highly polished. The music accompanying Sichuan opera utilizes a small gong and an instrument called a Guqin, which is similar to the Erhu.

The traditional formula is quite systematic with a combination of stunts like face-changing, tihuiyan, sword-hiding, fire-spitting and beard-changing with the plot and different characters.

5 styles
 Gaoqiang (高/高)
 Kunqiang (崑/昆)
 Huqing voice (鬍/胡)
 Tanxi (彈/弹)
 Dengdiao / Dengxi / Lantern theatre (燈/灯)

Costumes
Depending on the style, face paint is also limited compared to other related forms. Jing characters do not appear, and the only painted face characters are those with a small white patch in the middle of the face, which indicates a slightly evil character. The face paint colors are traditionally limited to black, red, white and grey.

References

 
Culture in Sichuan